Pewit Island is an uninhabited island at the north of Hamford Water off the coast of the English county of Essex. The nearest town is the port of Harwich along the coast to its north.

External links 

Pewit Island is a Nature Reserve, owned and managed by the Little Oakley and District Wildfowlers Association, in conjunction with English Nature.

Islands of Essex
Uninhabited islands of England
Tendring